The 1979-80 Four Hills Tournament took place at the four traditional venues of Oberstdorf, Garmisch-Partenkirchen, Innsbruck and Bischofshofen, located in Germany and Austria, between 29 December 1979 and 6 January 1980.

Results

Overall

References

External links 
 Official website 

Four Hills Tournament
1979 in ski jumping
1980 in ski jumping
1979 in West German sport
1980 in West German sport
1980 in Austrian sport
1980s in Innsbruck
1980 in Bavaria
1979 in Bavaria
December 1979 sports events in Europe
January 1980 sports events in Europe